Air Canada Rouge, Rouge meaning "red" in French, is a subsidiary of Air Canada, focused on operating lower-cost flights for leisure travelers. It is fully integrated into the Air Canada mainline and Air Canada Express networks; flights are sold with AC flight numbers but are listed as "operated by Air Canada Rouge" (similar to regional flights operated under the Air Canada Express banner).

History

The airline was launched in December 2012 and began services on July 1, 2013. The first destination was Athens, Greece, from Toronto and Montreal, as part of the Air Canada Leisure Group to compete more efficiently with Air Transat, Sunwing, and WestJet in the leisure and vacation travel market, largely operating routes to Europe, the Caribbean, and the United States. 

At the time of the launch, it had a fleet of four aircraft, two Airbus A319s and two Boeing 767s, transferred from the parent company. Its fleet expanded to 28 aircraft within 18 months and was expected to reach 16 Boeing 767s, 20 Airbus A319s and five Airbus A321s by mid-2016. By early September 2016, the airline had expanded its Boeing 767 fleet to 19 aircraft.

On March 24, 2014, Air Canada announced plans for Air Canada Rouge to expand into Western Canada beginning in Spring 2014, to serve predominantly leisure markets from Vancouver and Calgary to Los Angeles, San Francisco, Las Vegas, Phoenix, Palm Springs, Honolulu, Maui and Anchorage. A seasonal service from Vancouver to Osaka/Kansai started in May 2015. In December 2015, new routes were announced including Toronto to Miami, Fort Myers, Charlottetown, and Deer Lake. Year-round routes include Toronto and Montreal to Fort Lauderdale; Montreal to Miami; Vancouver to San Diego and Mexico City; and Calgary to Phoenix.

In May 2020, amidst the COVID-19 pandemic, Air Canada announced the retirements of 79 aircraft among its mainline and Rouge fleets. This included Boeing 767, Embraer 190, and Airbus A319 aircraft. Air Canada Rouge was significantly affected, as the airline lost all 25 767s, and 2 A319s, leaving it with only 18 A320/A321, and 20 Airbus A319 as their fleet. This means the airline will no longer be able to reach some of its destinations in Europe, such as Budapest or Zagreb. Plans are in the works to continue to fly to some European destinations that are in range of these narrowbody aircraft. As of February 2021, the airline removed most of its Central and Eastern European destinations from their schedule, e.g. Warsaw and Bucharest due to a lack of suitable aircraft.

Air Canada Rouge service was suspended from 9 February 2021 to 7 September 2021 to adhere to new travel rules by the government aimed at reducing non-essential travel.

Destinations

Air Canada Rouge serves leisure destinations in the Caribbean, Central America, Mexico predominantly, and the United States with all former routes to Europe and South America being cancelled after the retirement of the Boeing 767-300ERs.

Fleet

Current fleet
As of July 2022, the Air Canada Rouge fleet consists of an all-Airbus registered aircraft:

Former fleet 
 Boeing 767-300ER

Service concept

Seating
The Air Canada Rouge Airbus A319 has 16 more seats than a regular Air Canada Airbus A319 with 136 seats, the first four rows being for Rouge Plus and Premium Rouge passengers. The former Air Canada Rouge Boeing 767-300ER carried 71 more passengers than most regular Air Canada Boeing 767-300ER aircraft, with 282 seats. Of these 223 were economy, 35 Rouge Plus and 24 Premium Rouge.  The 29-inch seat pitch on their A320 series aircraft is one of the smallest in North America, resulting in less leg room than on most other comparable aircraft.

Entertainment
Air Canada Rouge is equipped with a wireless streaming entertainment system, called Player, that passengers can use directly on their personal devices, such as Apple iOS  and Android devices, as well as laptops.

All Air Canada Rouge aircraft are equipped with Wi-Fi provided by Intelsat (formerly Gogo Wi-Fi). In November 2022, Air Canada announced that Wi-Fi would be offered complimentary to customers flying in the Premium Rouge cabin.

On-board services
The baggage policy is the same as Air Canada's. Flights to and from Europe have complimentary food and drink service with for-purchase alcoholic drinks. A buy-on-board food offering in line with the mainline service exists for all other flights.

References

External links

 

Air Canada
Canadian companies established in 2012
Airlines established in 2012
Low-cost carriers
Canadian brands
Star Alliance affiliate members